Aframomum cordifolium is a monocotyledonous plant species the family Zingiberaceae first described by John Michael Lock and JBHall.

References 

cordifolium